Stella is a female given name. It is derived from the Latin word for star. It has been in use in English-speaking countries since it was first used by Philip Sidney in Astrophel and Stella, his 1580s sonnet sequence. Use might also have increased due to Stella Maris as a title for the Virgin Mary by Catholics.  Alternately, it is a feminine version of the Greek name Stylianos, meaning pillar.

Popularity 
Stella is a well-used name in recent years, among the most popular names for newborn girls in Australia, Belgium, Canada, Czech Republic, England, Finland, France, Iceland, Italy, Netherlands, New Zealand, Norway, Slovenia, Sweden, Switzerland, United States, and Wales.

List of people with the given name Stella

Arts and entertainment
 Stella, stage name of Stella Huang, singer-actress
 Stella Abrera, Filipino-American ballet dancer 
 Stella Adler, American actress and acting teacher
 Stella Arbenina, Russian-born actress
 Stella Bennett or Benee (born 2000), New Zealand singer-songwriter
 Stella Benson, English feminist, travel writer, and novelist
 Stella Blandy (1836-1925), French woman of letters, feminist
 Stella Bowen, Australian artist
 Stella Brennan (born 1974), New Zealand artist, curator, and essayist 
 Stella Chitty (1928–2005), British stage manager
 Stella Chiweshe, Zimbabwean musician
 Stella Ciarlantini, American actress and writer
 Stella Corkery, New Zealand artist and musician 
 Stella Dadzie (born 1952), British writer, historian, educationalist and activist
 Stella Feehily, London-born Irish playwright and actress
 Stella Keitel, American actress
 Stella Kon (born 1944), Singaporean playwright
 Stella Weiner Kriegshaber (1879–1966), American pianist
 Stella LeSaint (1881–1948), American silent film actress
 Stella Linden, actress and writer
 Stella Maessen, Dutch singer
 Stella Maeve, American actress
 Stella Malucchi (born 1977), Thai model and actress
 Stella March, pen name of a British romance novelist
 Stella Maxwell, Northern Irish model
 Stella Meghie, Canadian film director and screenwriter
 Stella Moray, English actress
 Stella Mwangi, Norwegian-Kenyan singer
 Stella Nickell, an American serial killer
 Stella Parton, American country music singer/songwriter, sister of Dolly Parton
 Stella Pevsner, author of children's books
 Stella Reid, co-star of the Fox network reality television show Nanny 911
 Stella Richman, British television producer
 Stella Roman, Romanian operatic soprano
 Stella Seah (born 1992), Singaporean singer-songwriter
 Stella Soleil, American pop and rock singer
 Stella Stevens (1934–2023) American model and actress born Estelle Eggleston
 Stella Steyn, Irish artist
 Stella Stocker, American composer and choral conductor
 Stella Stratigou, Greek actress
 Stella Vander, French singer and musician
 Stella Vine, English artist

Sports
 Stella Ashcroft (born 2002), gymnast from New Zealand
 Stella Barsosio, Kenyan long-distance runner
 Stella Boumi, Greek swimmer
 Stella Heiß, German curler
 Stella de Heij, Dutch field hockey goalkeeper
 Stela Posavec, Croatian handball player
 Stella Pilatou, Greek long jumper
 Stella Tsikouna, Greek discus thrower
 Stella Zakharova, Olympic gymnast for the former Soviet Union

Politics
 Stella Ambler, Canadian politician
 Stella Creasy, British Member of Parliament
Stella Dupont, French Member of Parliament
 Stella Garza-Hicks, former Republican legislator in the U.S. state of Colorado
 Stella Goldschlag (1922–1994), German Jewish woman who collaborated with the Gestapo during World War II, exposing and denouncing Berlin's underground Jews.
 Stella Isaacs, Marchioness of Reading, British political and military figure
 Stella Jantuan, Moldovan politician
 Stella Levy, Israeli soldier and politician
 Stella Oduah-Ogiemwonyi, Nigerian Minister of Aviation
 Stella Omu, Nigerian politician
 Stella Sigcau, Minister in the South African government and first female Prime Minister of the Transkei

Other
 Stella Baruk, Iranian-born French teacher, mathematician, author and educationalist
 Stella Cunliffe, British statistician
 Stella Immanuel, Cameroonian-American physician, author, and pastor 
 Stella Koutros, American cancer epidemiologist 
 Stella Liebeck, American plaintiff in the "McDonald's coffee case".
 Stella Manzie, British public servant and civil servant
 Stella Márquez, former Colombian beauty queen and first Miss International
 Stella Mary Newton, English fashion designer and dress historian
 Stella Mason (1???–1918), Muscogee/Creek freedman, subject to a known lawsuit over an estate
 Stella Maxwell, Northern Irish fashion model
 Stella McCartney, British fashion designer
 Stella Nickell, American murderer
 Stella Obasanjo, former First Lady of Nigeria
 Stella Rimington, British author and Director General of MI5
 Stella Ross-Craig, British botanic illustrator
 Stella Hackel Sims, Director of the United States Mint from 1977 to 1981
 Stella Tennant (1970–2020), Scottish model
 Stella Tillyard, British author and historian
 Stella Young (1982–2014), Australian comedian, journalist and disability rights activist

Fictional characters
Stella (Winx Club), one of the main characters of Winx Club
Stella a female snow goose who is Boris' girlfriend and appears in Balto III: Wings of Change
Stella, female protagonist of an anime movie Interstella 5555: The 5tory of the 5ecret 5tar 5ystem
Stella Bains, a character from the movie Back to the Future
Stella Bonasera, character in CSI: NY
Stella Bonnaro, character in Cowboy Bebop
Stella Chernak, character in the TV drama Peyton Place
Stella the Storyteller, fictional character from the TV series Barney & Friends
Stella Crawford, character in the BBC soap opera EastEnders
Stella Kowalski, character in the play A Streetcar Named Desire
Stella Loussier, character in the anime Gundam SEED Destiny
Stella Malone, character in the Disney Channel series Jonas
Stella Mann (television character), character in the German soap opera Verbotene Liebe (Forbidden Love)
Stella Maynard, character in Anne of the Island
Stella Moon, character in the Scottish BBC drama TV series Monarch of the Glen
Stella Morris, title character of Sky One series Stella
Stella Mudd,  wife of Harcourt Fenton "Harry" Mudd. from Star Trek "I, Mudd"
Stella Price, character in the British soap opera Coronation Street
Stella Vermillion, a mage knight from Chivalry of a Failed Knight
Stella Zhau, from the American animated series The Loud House.
Stella, the ideal woman in the work of Norwegian poet Henrik Wergeland
Stella is the name of the Glinda analogue in The Wizard of the Emerald City series by Alexander Volkov
Stella, a female Galah in the Angry Birds (franchise) series including the spin-off Angry Birds Stella
Stella Klauser, a non-playable character in Final Fantasy V
Queen Stella, a non-playable character in Final Fantasy IX
Stella, a non-playable character in Final Fantasy Fables: Chocobo's Dungeon
Stella, a supporting character in Totally Spies! in which she is the mother of super spy Clover
Stella, a character in the 2006 film Over the Hedge
Stella, one of the main characters in the series Trulli Tales
Stella the Star Fairy, a character from the Rainbow Magic book franchise
Stella Graybur, a character in Poppy Playtime
Stella Takachiho, a character in the Revue Starlight franchise

Name day
 Hungary: 14 July
 Latvia: 25 December
 Bulgaria: 26 November
 Czech Republic: 4 March
 Italy: 11 May

References

See also

 
 Estelle (given name)
 Esther (given name)
 Stella (disambiguation)

English feminine given names
Greek feminine given names
Italian feminine given names
Latin feminine given names